Sir Michael Henry Whitley (26 September 1872 – 14 October 1959) was a British colonial administrator who became a senior judge and later Attorney General in the Straits Settlements.

Education
Whitley was educated at Cranleigh School and then Blundell's School in Tiverton and read physics at King's College, London.

Career
Whitley joined the civil service of the Federated Malay States in 1896 and was called to the Bar by the Inner Temple. In 1918 he was appointed a Puisne Judge of the Straits Settlements, where he remained until his appointment as Attorney-General of Singapore in 1925.

Whitley retired and became a knight bachelor in 1929. He returned to England and was made a Justice of the Peace for Hampshire.

Sources 
Obituary of Sir Michael Whitley, The Times, 16 October 1959 (pg. 15; Issue 54593; col C)
”Death of Sir Michael Whitley reported”, The Straits Times, 24 February 1960
Janus, Catalogue entries for Sir Michael Whitley from the photographic collection of the British Association of Malaysia and Singapore, Extracted 6 May, 2010
Cranleigh School Register of Entries 1865-1890

1872 births
1959 deaths
People educated at Blundell's School
Alumni of King's College London
British colonial governors and administrators in Asia
Straits Settlements judges
British barristers
Attorneys-General of Singapore
Federated Malay States people
Knights Bachelor